The Rural Municipality of Lac Pelletier No. 107 is a rural municipality (RM) in the Canadian province of Saskatchewan within Census Division No. 4 and  Division No. 3. It is located in the southwest portion of the province.

History 
The RM of Lac Pelletier No. 107 incorporated as a rural municipality on January 1, 1913.

Geography

Communities and localities 
The following unincorporated communities are within the RM.

Organized hamlets
Darlings Beach

Localities
Blumenhof
Blumenort
Lac Pelletier
Neuhoffnung
Vesper

Attractions 
 Lac Pelletier Regional Park

Demographics 

Government 
The RM of Lac Pelletier No. 107 is governed by an elected municipal council and an appointed administrator that meets on the second Tuesday of every month. The reeve of the RM is Murray Spetz while its administrator is Sandra Krushelniski. The RM's office is located in Neville.

Transportation 
Highway 4
Highway 43
Highway 343

See also
List of rural municipalities in Saskatchewan

References 

Lac Pelletier

Division No. 4, Saskatchewan